HMS Airedale was a Hunt-class destroyer built for use by the British Royal Navy during the Second World War. She entered service in early 1942 as a convoy escort, being assigned to the Mediterranean Fleet in May. Airedale was sunk while escorting a convoy from Alexandria to Malta on 15 June 1942 by Sturzkampfgeschwader 3.

Construction and design
Airedale was one of seven Type III Hunt-class destroyers ordered for the Royal Navy on 4 July 1940, as part of the 1940 War Emergency Programme. The Hunt class was meant to fill the Royal Navy's need for a large number of small destroyer-type vessels capable of both convoy escort and operations with the fleet. The Type III Hunts differed from the previous Type II ships in replacing a twin 4-inch gun mount by two torpedo tubes to improve their ability to operate as destroyers.

Displacement was  standard and  under full load.

Main gun armament was four 4 inch (102 mm) QF Mk XVI dual purpose (anti-ship and anti-aircraft) guns in two twin mounts, with a quadruple 2-pounder "pom-pom" and three Oerlikon 20 mm cannon providing close-in anti-aircraft fire. Two  torpedo tubes were fitted in a single twin mount, while two depth charge chutes, four depth charge throwers and 70 depth charges comprised the ship's anti-submarine armament. Type 291 and Type 285 radar was fitted, as was Type 128 sonar.

Airedale was laid down at the Clydebank shipyard of the shipbuilders John Brown & Company on 20 November 1940 was launched on 12 August 1941 and was completed on 8 January 1942.

Service
Airedale joined the Home Fleet at Scapa Flow for workup after commissioning, and on 14 February 1942 left Kirkwall in Orkney as part of the escort of the Arctic convoy PQ 11 on the first stage of its journey to Murmansk in Northern Russia. During March she escorted the SS Queen Victoria to Gibraltar and then the cruiser  to the Cape of Good Hope. She was then assigned to the Mediterranean Fleet, arriving in Alexandria on 1 May, joining the 5th Destroyer Flotilla. On 10 May, the 14th Destroyer Flotilla (and ) set out from Alexandria to intercept an Italian convoy sailing from Italy to Benghazi. The flotilla was sighted by German reconnaissance aircraft on the afternoon of 11 May, and despite abandoning the mission and turning back towards Alexandria, came under heavy air attack from German bombers. Lively and Kipling were sunk and Jackal was badly damaged by the attacks, with Jackal being taken under tow by Jervis. By the time that Airedale met up with Jervis and Jackal, it had been decided to abandon the tow, and Jackal was scuttled by Jervis.

On 13 June Airedale set out from Alexandria as part of the escort of a large convoy to Malta (Operation Vigorous), while a second convoy (Operation Harpoon) was sailing to Malta from Gibraltar. On 14 June the Vigorous convoy came under heavy air attack, sinking one merchant ship and damaging another. The convoy turned back towards Alexandria on receiving reports of the Italian fleet sailing to intercept, and in the night of 14/15 June, German motor torpedo boats took advantage of the disruption caused by the course change to successfully attack the convoy, damaging the cruiser  and sinking the destroyer Hasty. Air attacks continued on 15 June, with the cruiser  being damaged by a bomb, and then at about 15:20, twelve Junkers Ju 87 dive bombers of StG 3. She was near missed by three bombs and hit by two bombs near the aft 4-inch gun mount. One of these bombs caused one of the ship's magazines (either the aft 4-inch magazine or the depth charge storage) to explode, and starting a large fire aft.

Notes

References

Further reading

External links
 

Hunt-class destroyers of the Royal Navy
World War II destroyers of the United Kingdom
Ships built on the River Clyde
1941 ships
Ships sunk by German aircraft
Destroyers sunk by aircraft
World War II shipwrecks in the Mediterranean Sea
Naval magazine explosions